Rathna Prasadaya was a skyscraper built by King Kanittha Tissa who ruled Ceylon from 167 to 186 AD. Mihindu II and Mihindu IV renovated the building during the 8th and 10th centuries. The bhikkhus of the Tapovana belonging to the Pansakulika sect resided here. Beautiful guard stones of the Abhayagiri Viharaya were found here. The most beautiful and perfect guardstone of the Anuradhapura era which stands today can be seen here.

External links
This page incorporates content from  Dr. Rohan Hettiarachchi's  used with permission of website owner.
NexCorp Photo Gallery & History

Anuradhapura
Anuradhapura period